Jamison Patten Hagerman (born May 7, 1981 in North Andover, Massachusetts and raised in Wenham, Massachusetts) is an American ice hockey player. She won a bronze medal at the 2006 Winter Olympics.

Playing career

Harvard Crimson
She played for the Harvard Crimson women's ice hockey program from 1999-2003. In those four years, she missed only one game. She was the team captain in her junior year. In her senior year, the Harvard defense allowed 1.47 goals per game, the lowest in the NCAA. In 2004, she would become an assistant coach for the Crimson.

USA Hockey
Her first experience with USA Hockey was winning a Gold Medal at the 2003 Four Nations Cup. Jamie Hagerman won a gold medal with Team USA at the 2005 IIHF Women's Ice Hockey championships. She registered one assist and a plus-minus rating of plus-5. In addition, she participated at the 2005 Four Nations Cup in Finland and won a silver medal. She led all USA players with a plus-minus rating of plus-8. Hagerman has participated in six USA Hockey National Women's Festivals (the first in 1998, the others from 2000–05).

Career stats

Awards and honors
 Harvard's John Dooley Award

See also
 World Fit

References

External links
Jamie Hagerman's U.S. Olympic Team bio

1981 births
American women's ice hockey defensemen
Harvard Crimson women's ice hockey players
Ice hockey players from Massachusetts
Ice hockey players at the 2006 Winter Olympics
Living people
Medalists at the 2006 Winter Olympics
Olympic bronze medalists for the United States in ice hockey
People from North Andover, Massachusetts
Sportspeople from Essex County, Massachusetts